Vanessa Chu, (born September 29, 1994 in Hong Kong) is a professional squash player who represents Hong Kong. She reached a career-high world ranking of World No. 49 in September 2019.

References

External links 

Hong Kong female squash players
Living people
1994 births
Hong Kong people